Coscia is an Italian surname. Notable people with the surname include:

Agustín Coscia (born 1997), Argentine footballer
Aristide Coscia (1918–1979), Italian footballer and manager
Benedict D. Coscia (1922−2008), American-born Brazilian Franciscan friar and Roman Catholic bishop
Gianni Coscia, Italian jazz accordionist
Hugo Coscia (born 1952), Argentine footballer
Niccolò Coscia (1681–1755), Italian cardinal
Raffaele Coscia (born 1983), Italian footballer

Italian-language surnames